Dark Star: The Music of the Grateful Dead is an album by the David Murray Octet released on Astor Place. It was released in 1996 and contains Murray's versions of compositions by the Grateful Dead.  The Octet plays on the first six tracks, and the last is a Murray solo, accompanied only by Bob Weir on acoustic guitar.

Track listing
 "Shakedown Street" (Garcia, Hunter) – 8:54  
 "Samson and Delilah" (Traditional) – 11:12  
 "Estimated Prophet" (Barlow, Weir) – 5:55  
 "Dark Star" (Garcia, Hunter, Kreutzmann, Lesh, McKernan, Weir) – 16:15  
 "China Doll" (Garcia, Hunter) – 5:17  
 "One More Saturday Night" (Weir) – 8:29  
 "Shoulda Had Been Me" (Cockburn, Nash, Weir) – 5:06  
Recorded on January 17–18, 1996 at Clinton Recording Studios, New York, NY

Personnel
David Murray – tenor saxophone, bass clarinet
Hugh Ragin – trumpet
James Zoller or Omar Kabir – trumpets
Craig Harris – trombone
James Spaulding – alto saxophone, flute
Robert Irving III – piano, hammond B-3 organ, synthesizer
Fred Hopkins – bass
Renzell Meritt – drums
Bob Weir – guitar (7)

References 

1996 albums
David Murray (saxophonist) albums
Grateful Dead tribute albums
Astor Place (label) albums